Verzlunarskóli Íslands, usually referred to as Verzló (official name in English: Commercial College of Iceland) is an Icelandic gymnasium. It was founded in 1905 and is the oldest private school in Iceland. The school is located in Reykjavík and has more than 900 students.
 
The gymnasium serves the whole of Iceland and has a student population of just below one thousand. It is organized on the basis of a form system, all students in the same form having the same timetable. Students are in school full-time from 8:15 – 15:40, Monday - Friday.
 
The school year consists of two semesters, fall and spring. Each semester students take a full-time load of courses worth five or six credits each. Over three years, they take a total of 140+ credits and matriculate with an Icelandic stúdentspróf which is the standard prerequisite for university admission in Iceland. This qualification is also accepted for admission to universities around the world.
 
In their first year all students follow a common curriculum. They then opt to specialise in one of four streams: business, science, social science and languages or arts. However, in all streams during the first two years there is a strong focus on practical business courses like accounting, economics and computer studies. These courses qualify students for the Commercial Diploma (‘Verzlunarpróf') at the end of their second year. In terms of the students' age and academic standard, the Commercial Diploma corresponds roughly to A-levels in the United Kingdom and the High School Diploma in the United States.
 
During the remaining two years of their three-year programme, students complete their stúdentspróf. These two years could be considered comparable to two years of study at an academic college, for example equivalent to two years of university- level foundation courses in an American junior college.

History
Verzló was founded in 1905 by the Store and Office Workers' Union and the Retailers' Association in Reykjavik. Since 1922 it has operated under the aegis of the Iceland Chamber of Commerce. The original objective was to give young people the opportunity of a basic commercial education. The school has steadily grown and developed since its inception. In 1996 the course offering was revised, leading to a reorganization of the streaming system and an increase in the number of courses offered. The revised streaming system was implemented in the fall of 1997.

Verzló is a non-profit organization operating under Charter No. 272/ 15 June 1993. According to this charter the main objectives of the college are to promote the competitiveness of Icelandic industry, both internally and internationally, by providing and furthering education in general and business education at secondary and tertiary levels in particular.

Events
One day in October each year, the students of Verzló and its rival school, Menntaskólinn í Reykjavík meet in the Hljómskálagarður park in down-town Reykjavík, where various games and competitions are held. These include: sprinting, soccer, rowing, giant-chess (later replaced with ordinary chess), screaming, tug-o-war, competitive eating, arm wrestling, car stuffing and Mexican-run. The night of that day, a debating competition between the two schools is held.

Notable alumni 
 Björgólfur Thor Björgólfsson, businessman, Iceland's first billionaire (in USD).
 Áslaug Arna Sigurbjörnsdóttir, member of parliament and minister of justice.
 Björgólfur Guðmundsson, businessman, Iceland's second billionaire (in USD).
 Gísli Marteinn Baldursson, former politician and TV programmer.
 Selma Björnsdóttir, singer and actress.
 Jóhanna Sigurðardóttir, former PM of Iceland.
 Þorsteinn Pálsson, former PM of Iceland.
 Jón Ásgeir Jóhannesson, businessman, cofounder of Bónus and former CEO of Baugur Group.
 Rán Ísold Eysteinsdóttir, actress known with her role in the TV series Trapped.

References

External links
Verzló's official web site

Educational institutions established in 1905
Education in Reykjavík
Gymnasiums in Iceland
1905 establishments in Iceland
Buildings and structures in Reykjavík